Melissa Courtney-Bryant (born 30 August 1993) is a British middle- and long-distance runner. She won the bronze medal in the 1500 metres at the 2018 Commonwealth Games and bronze for the 3000 metres at the 2019 and 2023 European Indoor Championships.

Courtney-Bryant is a two-time British indoor champion.

Athletics career
Born in Poole, Dorset, she initially focused on swimming, but switched to running. She joined Poole Athletic Club and worked under coach Mark Pauley from the age of twelve, as well as her father Mark as more runners joined the club. She credits her partner and fellow athlete, Ashley Bryant, which encouraging her to up her performance after a period of stagnation. After graduating from Brunel University London with a degree in sports psychology, she moved to train at Loughborough in 2017 to work with Rob Denmark.

Courtney made big improvements to her 800 m and 1500 m bests in 2013 and won the latter event at the BUCS Championships indoor and out that year. In the 2014 indoor season, she won the Welsh indoor title and came third at the British Indoor Championships. During the 2015 season her 800 m and 1500 m bests were brought down to 2:05.48 and 4:09.74 minutes and she made her international debut at the 2015 European Athletics U23 Championships, placing 10th in the 1500 m. Though she was seventh nationally at the 2016 British Athletics Championships, she ran a best of 4:07.55 minutes and gained selection for the 2016 European Athletics Championships, competing in the first round only. She teamed up with Cameron Boyek, Sarah McDonald, and Tom Marshall to take the gold medal in the inaugural mixed relay event at the 2017 European Cross Country Championships.

After winning the 1500 m British Universities title, she represented Great Britain at the 2017 Universiade and placed fifth in the final. That winter, she travelled to train in Iten in Kenya. Courtney was chosen to represent Wales at the 2018 Commonwealth Games and she won 1500 m bronze medal in a personal best time of 4:03.44 minutes, beaten only by Caster Semenya and Beatrice Chepkoech.

She won the 3000 m event at the Karlsruhe meeting of the 2019 IAAF World Indoor Tour with a time of 8:43.36. In March that year, she took bronze over the same distance at the European Indoor Championships, setting her personal best in the process.

On 24 December 2022, Courtney-Bryant set unofficial parkrun world record of 15 minutes 31 seconds in Poole, slicing six seconds off Samantha Harrison's female best mark.

Statistics

International competitions

Personal bests
 800 metres – 2:04.03 (Watford 2017)
 1500 metres – 4:01.81 (Stockholm 2020)
 1500 metres indoor – 4:04.79 (Liévin 2021)
 Mile run – 4:23.15 (London 2017)
 3000 metres – 8:39.20 (Birmingham 2018)
 3000 metres indoor – 8:38.22 (Glasgow 2019)
 5000 metres – 14:53.82 (Stockholm 2019)
Road
 5K run – 15:58 (Barrowford 2017)
 10K run – 33:14 (Houilles 2016)
Other
 Parkrun – 15:31 (Poole 2022)

National titles
 British Indoor Athletics Championships
 3000 metres: 2020, 2023

References

External links

1993 births
Living people
Sportspeople from Poole
Welsh female middle-distance runners
British female cross country runners
Welsh female cross country runners
Commonwealth Games bronze medallists for Wales
Commonwealth Games medallists in athletics
Athletes (track and field) at the 2018 Commonwealth Games
Alumni of Brunel University London
Competitors at the 2017 Summer Universiade
Medallists at the 2018 Commonwealth Games